The 1998 Paul Ricard 2 Hours 30 Minutes was the first race of the 1998 International Sports Racing Series.  It took place at Circuit Paul Ricard, France on April 13, 1998.

Official results
Class winners in bold.

External links
 World Sports Racing Prototypes – Results

P
International Sports Racing Series